Jack Dunn (born September 12, 1931) was a U.S. soccer inside right who was a four-time All-American, a member of the U.S. soccer team at the 1952 Summer Olympics.  He was a four-time All-American and coached at the collegiate level.

Player
Dunn grew up in Philadelphia, Pennsylvania where he played for the Lighthouse Boys Club and was three-time All City at Northeast Public High School.  He then attended Temple University, playing on the men's soccer team from 1951 to 1954.  He was a 1951 Honorable Mention (third team) All-American, 1953 Second Team All-American and 1952 and 1954 First Team All-American.  He graduated in 1955.  He was inducted into the Temple Hall of Fame in 1975.  In 1952, he was a member of the U.S. soccer team at the 1952 Summer Olympics.

He may have spent several years with Uhrik Truckers in the American Soccer League. He played for the Brooklyn German Hungarians for a time. He also played and coached for the Philadelphia United German-Hungarians  winning the 1965 National Amateur Cup with them.  He played on four professional championship teams.

He spent several years in the U.S. Army.  He was discharged in 1958 and began working at Gulf Oil Company.

Coach
He later coached at both the amateur and collegiate levels.  In 1958, he was hired by St. Joseph's College in Philadelphia.  He coached the school's team until 1975, compiling a 120–57–23 record.

References

External links
Temple University Hall of Fame

Living people
Sportspeople from Philadelphia
American soccer coaches
American soccer players
American Soccer League (1933–1983) players
Lighthouse Boys Club players
Temple Owls men's soccer players
Footballers at the 1952 Summer Olympics
Saint Joseph's Hawks men's soccer coaches
Olympic soccer players of the United States
Uhrik Truckers players
Soccer players from Philadelphia
Association football forwards
1931 births